Great Falls Depot, also known as the Seaboard Air Line Railway Depot, is a historic train station located at Great Falls, Chester County, South Carolina. It was built in 1911-1912 by the Seaboard Air Line Railroad. It is a one-story, rectangular brick building, with a hipped roof and eaves that extend six feet beyond the building. The design of the waiting room area exemplifies the prevailing early-20th century practice of separate accommodations for blacks and whites.

It was listed on the National Register of Historic Places in 1980.

References

Railway stations on the National Register of Historic Places in South Carolina
Railway stations in the United States opened in 1912
Seaboard Air Line Railroad stations
National Register of Historic Places in Chester County, South Carolina
1912 establishments in South Carolina
Former railway stations in South Carolina